Francesco Marino is an Italian ordinary of the Catholic Church and the current Bishop of Avellino.

Biography 
Francesco Marino was born in Cesa, a comune in Campania, Italy. He studied at the Campano Interregional Pontifical Seminary of Naples (Posillipo) and was ordained a priest on 6 October 1979 in the Diocese of Aversa.

On 13 November 2004, Pope John Paul II appointed him the Bishop of Avellino, succeeding Antonio Forte, who retired due to age. He was consecrated in the Aversa Cathedral on 8 January 2005 by Crescenzio Cardinal Sepe. and co-consecrators Mario Milano and Antonio Forte. He took the Latin motto "nos multi in illo uno unum."

On 31 July 2015, he served as principal consecrator of Sergio Melillo.

In 2011, he was elected to the Episcopal Commission for the Campano Interregional Pontifical Seminary of Naples (Posillipo).

On 11 November 2016, Marino was appointed the Bishop of Nola, succeeding Bishop Beniamino Depalma.

References

External links 

Diocese of Avellino website
Diocese of Nola website

Living people
21st-century Italian Roman Catholic bishops
People from the Province of Caserta
Bishops of Avellino
1955 births